Szczecin agglomeration or Stettin agglomeration is the urban agglomeration of the city of Szczecin and surrounding towns in the Polish-German border area.

The Larger Urban Zone defined by Eurostat includes 777,806 people living on 5249 km2 in the area (2012). It includes the cities and towns of Stargard, Świnoujście, Police, Schwedt, Goleniów, Gryfino, Prenzlau, Pasewalk, Ueckermünde, Eggesin, Gartz, Stepnica, Penkun, Brüssow and Nowe Warpno.
There are a group of villages situated between Szczecin and towns of the agglomeration. The villages of Mierzyn, Löcknitz, Przecław, Dobra, Trzebież and Kobylanka are parts of the urban system.

Since 2012, the agglomeration is actively developed as the core of a wider European metropolitan area, likely including the German districts of Mecklenburgische Seenplatte, Vorpommern-Greifswald, Uckermark and the West Pomeranian districts neighbouring Szczecin in Poland.

Subcenters

See also 
 Metropolitan areas in Poland

References 

 
 
 
Cities and towns in West Pomeranian Voivodeship
Port cities and towns in Poland
Towns in Brandenburg
Towns in Mecklenburg-Western Pomerania
Vorpommern-Greifswald
Metropolitan areas of Poland
Urban areas in Poland